John Marshall (31 July 1895–1968) was an English footballer who played in the Football League for Preston North End, Southport and Wigan Borough.

References

1895 births
1968 deaths
English footballers
Association football defenders
English Football League players
Rochdale A.F.C. players
Shelbourne F.C. players
Southport F.C. players
Preston North End F.C. players
Wigan Borough F.C. players